Eremonidia is a monotypic moth genus of the family Notodontidae. Its only species, Eremonidia mirifica, is known from two mountain ranges in the south-western part of the Dominican Republic. Both the genus and species were  first described by John E. Rawlins and James S. Miller in 2008.

References

Notodontidae
Monotypic moth genera
Moths of the Caribbean